South American Americans are diaspora from South America who emigrate to the United States. Many of these people are also considered Hispanic and Latino Americans, but not all South Americans speak a Romance language, such as Surinamese Americans who primarily speak English and Dutch, Guyanese Americans are sometimes but not always considered Latino as they primarily speak French, other South American immigrants may speak a language indigenous to the continent or another immigrant language.

Groups
 Argentine Americans
 Bolivian Americans
 Brazilian Americans
 Chilean Americans
 Colombian Americans
 Ecuadorian Americans
 Guyanese Americans
 Paraguayan Americans
 Peruvian Americans
 Surinamese Americans
 Uruguayan Americans
 Venezuelan Americans

See also
Hispanic and Latino (ethnic categories)
Panamanian Americans
Latin American diaspora

Notes

South America
Demographics of the United States